Yane Bugnard (born 24 April 1974) is a retired Swiss football midfielder.

References

1974 births
Living people
Swiss men's footballers
Étoile Carouge FC players
FC Lugano players
FC Sion players
AC Bellinzona players
FC Lausanne-Sport players
Association football midfielders
Swiss Super League players